Boxwood,  also known as the Thomas J.B. Turner House, is an antebellum plantation house in southwestern Rutherford County, Tennessee, near Murfreesboro in the historic Salem community.

The house was built by Thomas J. B. Turner and his wife, Sarah Jetton Turner, and completed in 1843. It is a two-story brick house built on an I-house plan. Greek Revival architectural influences characteristic of antebellum architecture are evident in its design, which features a divided pedimented portico with square Doric columns and a balustrade. The name of the house derives from the boxwood plantings on the grounds, which are said to have originated with plants that Turner brought to Tennessee in a powder horn.

The Union Army occupied Boxwood during the Civil War.

Boxwood was listed on the National Register of Historic Places in 1984.

References

Houses completed in 1843
Houses on the National Register of Historic Places in Tennessee
Buildings and structures in Murfreesboro, Tennessee
Greek Revival houses in Tennessee
1843 establishments in Tennessee
Houses in Rutherford County, Tennessee
National Register of Historic Places in Rutherford County, Tennessee